Baek Ha-na (Hangul: 백하나; born 22 September 2000) is a South Korean badminton player who attended Cheongsong Girls' High School. She started playing badminton in 2009 after being recommended by her brother, and was selected to join the national team in 2017. She was a gold medalist in the girls' doubles event at the 2017 Asian Junior Championships and the World Junior Championships with Lee Yu-rim. Their first major result in a senior event came when she and Lee reached the final at the 2017 Macau Open, but lost to Chinese pair Huang Yaqiong and Yu Xiaohan with the score 10–21, 17–21.

Achievements

World Junior Championships 
Girls' doubles

Asian Junior Championships 
Girls' doubles

Mixed doubles

BWF World Tour (5 titles, 9 runners-up) 
The BWF World Tour, which was announced on 19 March 2017 and implemented in 2018, is a series of elite badminton tournaments sanctioned by the Badminton World Federation (BWF). The BWF World Tour is divided into levels of World Tour Finals, Super 1000, Super 750, Super 500, Super 300, and the BWF Tour Super 100.

Women's doubles

BWF Grand Prix (1 runner-up) 
The BWF Grand Prix had two levels, the Grand Prix and Grand Prix Gold. It was a series of badminton tournaments sanctioned by the Badminton World Federation (BWF) and played between 2007 and 2017.

Women's doubles

  BWF Grand Prix Gold tournament
  BWF Grand Prix tournament

BWF International Challenge/Series (1 title) 
Women's doubles

  BWF International Challenge tournament
  BWF International Series tournament

References

External links 
 

2000 births
Living people
People from Gimcheon
South Korean female badminton players
Badminton players at the 2018 Asian Games
Asian Games competitors for South Korea
Sportspeople from North Gyeongsang Province
21st-century South Korean women